Fairoz Hasan (born 26 November 1988) is a Singaporean footballer who plays as a forward for Albirex Niigata (S).

Career
Fairoz started his career at Sengkang Punggol in 2008. He was selected to represent Singapore in the Vietnam Under-21 Open competition.

Fairoz was fined $1,500 and banned for eight months for his involvement in the fight on Sept 7 2010 between the Young Lions and Beijing Guoan Talent, during a S.League match at Jalan Besar Stadium.

Career statistics

Club

Notes

References

External links
 
 Young Lions Team Page at S.League 

Living people
1988 births
Gombak United FC players
Geylang International FC players
Hougang United FC players
Association football forwards
Singapore Premier League players
Singaporean footballers
Young Lions FC players